Jesuit High School is a private, non-profit, Catholic college-preparatory high school (grades 8–12) for boys run by the USA Central and Southern Province of the Society of Jesus in Mid-City New Orleans, Louisiana. The school was founded in 1847 by the Jesuits as the College of the Immaculate Conception before taking on its current name in 1911, and serves students of all religious faiths.

Mission and Philosophy 
The mission of Jesuit High School as a Catholic, college preparatory school is to develop  its students the competence, conscience, and compassion that will enable them to be men of faith and men for others.

The Jesuit approach to education is based on nearly five hundred years of tradition beginning with St. Ignatius Loyola, who founded the Society of Jesus (“the Jesuits”) in 1540. It begins with a focus on students and their potential, a principle the Jesuits call cura personalis. The school encourages personal excellence in all aspects of life—intellectual, emotional, moral, and physical. This principle is often called magis, meaning "more" or "greater," referring to the rigor of intellectual exchange and the varied challenges the school poses to its students through its curriculum.

History

Founding and Early History
The College of the Immaculate Conception was founded in 1847 and opened in 1849. It was both a secondary school and college, and both were located in the Faubourg Ste. Marie of New Orleans (now the New Orleans Central Business District), a block upriver from the French Quarter, at the corner of Baronne and Common Streets. The delayed start of the school's first year came as a result of the spread of Yellow Fever, and the school's founder, Jean Baptiste Maisonabe, S.J., himself fell victim to the disease. Maisonabe was succeeded by John Cambiaso, S.J., who largely responsible for the design of the Church of the Immaculate Conception.

The Church of the Immaculate Conception remains on the original campus and plays an active role in the Jesuit High School community today.

The Move to Carrollton & Banks 
In 1911, the high school and college divisions were split, and the college division relocated to St. Charles Avenue, eventually becoming Loyola University New Orleans. The high school remained on Baronne Street until 1926, when it was moved to its current location at 4133 Banks Street in Mid-City. 

Since 1926, several additions have been made to the campus. In 1953 a wing was added along Palmyra Street; the addition included an auditorium, the Chapel of the North American Martyrs, a cafeteria, a library, several classrooms, and a band room. A recreation center and gym was constructed on Banks Street across from the school in 1957 and provided facilities for the athletic teams and the physical education program.

A resource center, featuring the school's library, additional classrooms, and science facilities was built in 1974. The area was upgraded again in 2001, when the Student Commons was constructed under the resource center with further renovations to the school following after Hurricane Katrina.

In 2012, John Ryan Stadium, a baseball and multi-purpose sports stadium, was constructed at 100 Blue Jay Way in Metairie, LA, marking the school's expansion into Jefferson Parish.

Recent Leadership

In recent times, Fr. Raymond Fitzgerald, S.J., (Class of 1976) served as school president and was succeeded by 1966 graduate Fr. Anthony McGinn, S.J. In May 2015 it was announced that Fr. Chris Fronk, S.J., on active duty as a U.S. Navy chaplain, would serve as the school's 30th president, and he assumed office in November 2016. In January 2020, Fr. Chris Fronk, S.J., stepped down from school president. Fr. John Brown, S.J., who is currently the school's president, took over the role in 2020, becoming the school's 31st president.

The principal is Peter Kernion (Class of 1990).

Mascot, Colors, and Logo
The mascot is a blue jay posed with his fists raised, designed by cartoonist Walt Kelly of Pogo fame. A contest among students was held to name the mascot in 1954, and the name "Jayson" won.

The school's colors are blue and white to honor the Virgin Mary. Student athletes wore a white sweater with a blue letter "J" on it and were referred to as the "Blue Js"—hence the eventual selection of the mascot.  As with many Jesuit schools, the school's motto is Ad Majorem Dei Gloriam ("For the Greater Glory of God").

Athletics
Jesuit athletics competes in the LHSAA.

Athletic history
Since 1933, Jesuit has won numerous state championships in football, basketball, baseball, wrestling, and soccer. The 1946 athletic year yielded undefeated state champions in baseball, basketball, track and field, and football—all coached by G. Gernon Brown.  It has been said that Jesuit had "All the Tricks in '46."

In the 2004–2005 school year, Jesuit won state championships in baseball, cross country, soccer, tennis, wrestling, rugby, and swimming, and went to the state playoffs in football with an undefeated regular season. In 2012 Jesuit built Ryan stadium, a state of the art facility accommodating football, baseball, and soccer on a field covered entirely with artificial turf. In 2015, Jesuit was the first prep school in the States to get a germ-zapping robot, gift of an alumnus.

Cross Country 
In 2005, Jesuit became the first 5A school in Louisiana history to win three state championships in a row in the sport of cross country. In 2006 they continued with an unprecedented 4th cross country state championship.

Swimming 
Jesuit swimming holds the LHSAA record for most consecutive state championships in any sport, with 18 straight. As of November 20, 2010, Jesuit Swimming has captured 36 state championships. The streak was broken in 2005 when the team, still feeling the effects of Hurricane Katrina, was only able to field 12 swimmers, yet managed to take second place, only a few points out of first. In 2006, however, the team was able to recapture the state championship.

Wrestling 
In wrestling within the state of Louisiana, Jesuit's rival Holy Cross was the perennial state champs under Br. Melchior Polowy in the 1940s, 1950s, and 1960s. Then in 1969 Jesuit hired Surachai "Sam" Harnsongkram as its new wrestling coach. In 1972 the Jesuit High School Blue Jays won the first of 18 State Championships under Coach Sam, including 11 in a row from 1988–1998. Prior to that 1972 win, Jesuit's only state championship was in 1951. And since that string-of-11 (ending in 1998) Jesuit has won 4 more state wrestling championships, with the last being in 2009. High School wrestling in Louisiana has become much more visible starting in the 1990s, resulting in other schools developing programs to challenge the "leaders". From 1999-til-2015, Jesuit has won 4 more state championships, and has been runner-up in the other years.

Baseball 
From 2007–09 Jesuit made it to the state tournament three times, and twice to the American Legion playoffs winning one championship. In August 2012, Jesuit's baseball team won the American Legion World Series.  Jesuit's American Legion teams also won the national championship in 1946 and 1960. Jesuit won the 2021 Louisiana State High School Athletic Association Division I state championship.

Football 
In football, Jesuit High School vs. Holy Cross High School is the oldest continuous high school rivalry in Louisiana and one of the oldest continuous high school football rivalries in the United States. The first game was played in 1922 (Jesuit won by 52–0) and the two teams have played every year since (twice in 1963: once in regular season and another time for the state crown which Holy Cross won) Blue Jays vs. Tigers. 

Jesuit has won eight football state championships in 1933, 1940, 1941, 1943, 1946, 1953, 1960, and 2014. 
The Jesuit football team played for a state championship during the 2014 season against the John Curtis Patriots. It was the Blue Jays' first championship game appearance since 1978 against St. Augustine. Jesuit defeated John Curtis 17–14 to win the Division 1 state championship. Running back Charles Jackson was voted the game's most valuable player.

Basketball 
In February 1965, Jesuit's all-white basketball team played a secret game against St. Augustine, the city's all-male, all-black high school. The Purple Knights won the game, which was the basis for the 1999 motion picture Passing Glory. That same year, Jesuit won the 1965 Louisiana High School Athletic Association state championship in Class AAA (at the time the state's highest classification) while St. Augustine won the championship of the Louisiana Interscholastic and Literary Organization, the sanctioning body for the state's black schools. In the fall of 1967, St. Augustine joined the LHSAA and became a rival for the Blue Jays in the New Orleans Catholic League through the 2010–11 school year, when the Purple Knights were reclassified Class 4A by the LHSAA.

Soccer 
In the 1998–1999 season, 2006–2007 season, 2008–2009 season, and also the 2009–2010 season, Jesuit fielded one of the best soccer teams in the nation, winning the Louisiana state title and in all four cases ending the season undefeated. This record gave the Jesuit team a #3 (1998–99), a #2 (2006–2007), a #1 (2008–2009), and a #3 (2009–2010) rank in the nation.  The 2008–2009 team is considered the best high school soccer team in LHSAA history. In the three seasons from 2009–2011, the soccer team had a 94-game unbeaten streak, which is the fourth longest unbeaten streak in the country.

Rugby 
In the 2007–2008 season, the rugby team won the State Championship for the sixth consecutive year with an undefeated season, only allowing 12 points while scoring over 300. Because of a conflict with the senior prom, the team was forced to play in the more difficult multi-school division at the Southern Regionals in Murfreesboro, Tennessee. The team swept regionals and moved on to become 8th in the country in the multi-school division at the USA Rugby Boys High School National Championship. In 2017, the Blue Jays reclaimed the State Championship, winning the title for the first time since 2011, with an overtime victory over the Bayou Hurricanes, 25–22. In 2018, the Blue Jays remained the State Champions with a victory over the Brother Martin Crusaders, 22–12.

Lacrosse 
In 2014, Jesuit New Orleans won the 2014 Allstate Sugar Bowl Lacrosse Classic, with 14 schools competing from Louisiana, Texas, Mississippi, and Alabama. In 2021, the Lacrosse team won the Louisiana High School Lacrosse state championship after completing an undefeated season.

Golf 
Jesuit won the state championship twice in the late 1990s.

Hurricane Katrina

When the flooding following Hurricane Katrina devastated New Orleans, Jesuit High School was inundated, five feet (1.5 m) of water ruining the ground floor.  When the school announced that it was closed indefinitely, many students enrolled in schools in cities where they had evacuated.  The largest concentration of students attended a satellite school at Strake Jesuit College Preparatory in Houston; at one point, approximately 420 displaced students attended classes at night with their own teachers and classmates.  In mid-October, Jesuit opened another satellite school at St. Martin's Episcopal School in Metairie in unincorporated Jefferson Parish, Louisiana, where about 500 students attended until Thanksgiving. After Thanksgiving, Jesuit's students and faculty returned to their own campus, becoming the first flooded school in New Orleans to reopen – albeit with an unusable first floor. The school held its annual Thanksgiving Drive for the poor living in the surrounding neighborhoods. On 23 January 2006, 1285 of the 1450 students returned to attend Jesuit for the second semester. After the Hurricane Maria in Puerto Rico in 2017, Jesuit hosted students from Colegio San Ignacio in Puerto Rico.

History of sexual abuse
There have been several instances of child sexual abuse at the school. The Jesuit order confirmed that at least fourteen clergy assigned to Jesuit High were credibly accused of sexual abuse. The accused clergy were active until the 1990s, and almost all are currently deceased.  Several other priests and employees at the school have also been confirmed by the administration as abusers, and the school has allegedly paid large settlements to the families.

Notable alumni

In 1978, James K. Glassman in The Atlantic wrote that "Practically every white Orleanian of note went to" Jesuit.

In chronological order:

Larry Gilbert (Class of 1910), MLB player (Boston Braves)
F. Edward Hebert (Class of 1920), U.S. Congressman (1940–1976)
Robert B. Landry (Class of 1929), United States military officer
Charlie Gilbert (Class of 1937), MLB player (Brooklyn Dodgers, Chicago Cubs, Philadelphia Phillies)
Fats Dantonio (Class of 1938), MLB player (Brooklyn Dodgers)
Connie Ryan (Class of 1938), MLB player (New York Giants, Boston Braves, Cincinnati Reds, Philadelphia Phillies, Chicago White Sox) and MLB manager (Texas Rangers, Atlanta Braves)
Jimmy Fitzmorris (Class of 1939), Lieutenant Governor of Louisiana (1972–1980)
Ray Coates (Class of 1944), MVP 1947 Cotton Bowl, member of LSU’s 1946 Southeastern Conference championship baseball team
Adrian G. Duplantier (Class of 1945), United States federal judge 
Putsy Caballero (Class of 1946), MLB player (Philadelphia Phillies)
Warren Leruth (Class of 1946), chef and restaurateur; credited with naming and developing Green Goddess salad dressing
Tookie Gilbert (Class of 1947), MLB player (New York Giants)
John Petitbon (Class of 1947), Notre Dame and National Football League player
Donald Wetzel (Class of 1947), inventor of the modern, networked Automated Teller Machine (ATM)
Moon Landrieu (Class of 1948), Mayor of New Orleans (1970–1978) and Secretary of Housing and Urban Development
John Grenier (Class of 1948), Alabama attorney and Republican Party figure
Clyde F. Bel, Jr. (Class of 1951), businessman and state representative for Orleans Parish, 1964–1972 and 1975–1980
Marv Breeding (Class of 1952), MLB player (Baltimore Orioles, Washington Senators, Los Angeles Dodgers)
John R. Bourgeois (Class of 1951), served as the 25th director of The President’s Own Marine Band for 17 years. During that time, he served as music director for the White House. Bourgeois currently serves as president of the John Philip Sousa Foundation as well as president of the National Band Association. 
John Favalora (Class of 1954), Archbishop of Miami, Florida (1994–2010)
John Volz (Class of 1954), attorney for United States District Court for the Eastern District of Louisiana
A. J. McNamara (Class of 1954), member of Louisiana House of Representatives, 1976–1980; judge for U.S. District Court, 1982–2001
Richie Petitbon (Class of 1955), Tulane University and National Football League player, Washington Redskins head coach, won four NFL championships
Rusty Staub (Class of 1961), Major League Baseball player, 6-time All-Star, New York Mets Hall of Fame
Pat Screen  (Class of 1961), state champion 1960, LSU quarterback, Mayor-President of East Baton Rouge Parish (1981–1988)
Charles D. Lancaster Jr. (Class of 1961), New Orleans attorney and Republican member of Louisiana House of Representatives
Jim Donelon (Class of 1962), Louisiana insurance commissioner
Jay Thomas (Class of 1966), actor (Eddie LeBec of Cheers, Murphy Brown) and radio personality (Sirius Satellite Radio, Channel 104 M-TH, Channel 101 F)
Jason Berry (Class of 1967), investigative journalist, book author, and historian
Jay Zainey (Class of 1969), Federal District Court judge, appointed by President George W. Bush
Paul Schott Stevens (Class of 1970), attorney, serving on the National Security Council under President Ronald Reagan
Steve Foley (Class of 1971), NFL player (Denver Broncos) 
Jim Gaudet (Class of 1973), MLB player (Kansas City Royals)
Michael T. Dugan (Class of 1975), educator and accounting scholar
Ellis Henican (Class of 1976), journalist and voice actor ("Stormy" Waters of Sealab 2021)
Christian LeBlanc (Class of 1976), actor (Michael Baldwin of The Young and the Restless)
Marc Morial (Class of 1976), Mayor of New Orleans (1994–2002)
Brett Giroir (Class of 1978), American Physician Scientist, Assistant Secretary for Health (2018-2021), former four-star admiral in the U.S. Public Health Service Commissioned Corps
Mitch Landrieu (Class of 1978), Mayor of New Orleans and son of former Mayor Moon Landrieu (1970–1978), former Lieutenant Governor
Fred LeBlanc (Class of 1981), drummer and singer in rock band Cowboy Mouth
Will Clark (Class of 1982), Major League Baseball player, 6-time All-Star, Gold Glove winner
James Garvey, Jr. (Class of 1982), District 1 member of Louisiana Board of Elementary and Secondary Education since 2008; lawyer and accountant
Brad Brewster (Class of 1984), drummer for garage punk band M.O.T.O. (1987); internet and multi-media entrepreneur
Fred Weller (Class of 1984), Broadway and television actor
Harry Connick, Jr. (Class of 1985), musician, recording artist, actor and television personality
Jay Duplass (Class of 1991), filmmaker (Baghead, Cyrus, Togetherness)
Cameron Henry (Class of 1992), business analyst and Louisiana state legislator
Mark Duplass (Class of 1995), filmmaker, actor (Baghead, Cyrus, The League, Togetherness)
Michael White (Class of 1995), men's head basketball coach at the University of Georgia
Walt Leger III (Class of 1996), attorney and state legislator, former Speaker Pro Tempore, Louisiana House of Representatives 
Christian N. Weiler (Class of 1997), tax lawyer
Corey Hilliard (Class of 2003), football player, selected by New England Patriots in 2007 NFL Draft
Gregory Agid (Class of 2005), jazz clarinetist and saxophonist, Tulane adjunct faculty and leader of the Gregory Agid Quartet
Travis Andrews (Class of 2005), journalist for the Washington Post and author of the 2021 biography Because He's Jeff Goldblum (Penguin Random House). 
Johnny Giavotella (Class of 2005), second baseman for Kansas City Royals
Ryan Adams (Class of 2006), MLB player (Baltimore Orioles)
Patrick Mullins (Class of 2010), professional soccer player
Kyle Keller, (Class of 2011), MLB player, currently (Miami Marlins) 
Deion Jones (Class of 2012), linebacker for LSU, selected in second round (52nd pick overall) in the 2016 NFL draft by the Atlanta Falcons
Tanner Lee (Class of 2013), quarterback for Nebraska Cornhuskers, selected in sixth round (203rd pick overall) in the 2018 NFL Draft by the Jacksonville Jaguars 
Foster Moreau (Class of 2015), tight end for LSU, selected in the fourth round (137th pick overall) in the 2019 NFL draft by the Oakland Raiders
Hap Glaudi

Notable students (attended but did not graduate) 
Edward Douglass White (Class of 1865), Chief Justice of the United States
Malcolm John Rebennack, Jr., known by his stage name Dr. John (was asked to leave because he was playing at clubs while underage)
Louis Prima (transferred to Warren Easton High School in 1926)
Alois "Al" Hirt ‘39, world-renowned trumpeter and entertainer

See also
 List of Jesuit secondary schools in the United States

References

External links

Jesuit High School website
Blue Jays vs. Tigers
 Tour with Harry Connick

Boys' schools in Louisiana
Jesuit high schools in the United States
Jesuit New Orleans Province
Private middle schools in New Orleans
Catholic secondary schools in New Orleans
Private high schools in New Orleans
Educational institutions established in 1847
1847 establishments in Louisiana